Luke Edmunds is an Australian politician, who was elected to the Tasmanian Legislative Council as the Labor member for Pembroke since he was elected at the 2022 Pembroke state by-election replacing Jo Siejka.

Edmunds was raised in Launceston, and worked as a journalist for all three of Tasmania's major newspapers: The Examiner, The Advocate and The Mercury.

References

Year of birth missing (living people)
Living people
Members of the Tasmanian Legislative Council
Australian Labor Party members of the Parliament of Tasmania
Australian journalists
21st-century Australian politicians